The Pulitzer Prize for Breaking News Reporting is a Pulitzer Prize awarded for a distinguished example of breaking news, local reporting on news of the moment. It has been awarded since 1953 under several names:

From 1953 to 1963: Pulitzer Prize for Local Reporting, Edition Time
From 1964 to 1984: Pulitzer Prize for Local General or Spot News Reporting
From 1985 to 1990: Pulitzer Prize for General News Reporting
From 1991 to 1997: Pulitzer Prize for Spot News Reporting
From 1998 to present: Pulitzer Prize for Breaking News Reporting

Prior to 1953, a Pulitzer Prize for Local Reporting combined both breaking and investigative reporting under one category.  The Pulitzer Committee issues an official citation explaining the reasons for the award.

Hitherto confined to local coverage, the Breaking News Reporting category was expanded to encompass state and national reporting in 2017.

List of winners for Pulitzer Prize for Local Reporting, Edition Time

 1953: Editorial Staff of Providence (RI) Journal and Evening Bulletin, "for their spontaneous and cooperative coverage of a bank robbery and police chase leading to the capture of the bandit."
 1954: Staff of Vicksburg (MS) Sunday Post-Herald, "for its outstanding coverage of the tornado of December 5, 1953, under extraordinary difficulties."
 1955: Caro Brown, Alice (TX) Daily Echo, "for a series of news stories dealing with the successful attack on one-man political rule in neighboring Duval County, written under unusual pressure both of edition time and difficult, even dangerous, circumstances. Mrs. Brown dug into the facts behind the dramatic daily events, as well, and obtained her stories in spite of the bitterest political opposition, showing professional skill and courage."
 1956: Lee Hills, Detroit Free Press, ;'for his aggressive, resourceful and comprehensive front page reporting of the United Automobile Workers' negotiations with Ford and General Motors for a guaranteed annual wage."
 1957: Staff of Salt Lake Tribune, "for its prompt and efficient coverage of the crash of two air liners over the Grand Canyon, in which 128 persons were killed."
 1958: Staff of Fargo (ND) Forum, (ND)"for its swift, vivid and detailed news and picture coverage of a tornado which struck Fargo on June 20."
 1959: Mary Lou Werner, The Evening Star,  (Washington DC) "for her comprehensive year-long coverage of the integration crisis in Virginia which demonstrated admirable qualities of accuracy, speed and the ability to interpret the news under deadline pressure in the course of a difficult and taxing assignment"
 1960: Jack Nelson, The Atlanta Constitution, "for his reporting of abuses at the Milledgeville Central State Mental Hospital."
 1961: Sanche De Gramont, (Ted Morgan) of the  New York Herald Tribune "for his moving account of the death of Leonard Warren on the Metropolitan Opera stage."
 1962: Robert D. Mullins, Deseret News, Salt Lake City, UT, "For his resourceful coverage of a murder and kidnapping at Dead Horse Point, Utah."
 1963: Sylvan Fox, Anthony Shannon, William Longgood, New York World-Telegram and Sun "for their reporting of an air crash in Jamaica Bay, killing 95 persons on March 1, 1962."

List of winners for Pulitzer Prize for Local General or Spot News Reporting
 1964: Norman C. Miller The Wall Street Journal, "for his comprehensive account of a multi-million dollar vegetable oil swindle in New Jersey.
 1965: Melvin H. Ruder Hungry Horse News, a weekly in Columbia Falls, MT, "for his daring and resourceful coverage of a disastrous flood that threatened his community, an individual effort in the finest tradition of spot news reporting.
 1966: Staff Los Angeles Times, "for its coverage of the Watts riots.
 1967: Robert V. Cox Chambersburg (PA) Public Opinion, "for his vivid deadline reporting of a mountain manhunt that ended with the killing of a deranged sniper who had terrorized the community.
 1968: Staff Detroit Free Press, "for its coverage of the Detroit riots of 1967, recognizing both the brilliance of its detailed spot news staff work and its swift and accurate investigation into the underlying causes of the tragedy.
 1969: John Fetterman Louisville (TN) Times and Courier-Journal, "for his article, "Pfc. Gibson Comes Home," the story of an American soldier whose body was returned to his native town from Vietnam for burial.
 1970: Thomas Fitzpatrick Chicago Sun-Times, "for his article about the violence of youthful radicals in Chicago, "A Wild Night's Ride With SDS."
 1971: Staff Akron (OH) Beacon Journal, "for its coverage of the Kent State University tragedy on May 4, 1970.
 1972: Richard Cooper and John Machacek Rochester (NY) Times-Union, "for their coverage of the Attica, New York prison riot.
 1973: Staff Chicago Tribune, "for uncovering flagrant violations of voting procedures in the primary election of March 21, 1972.
 1974: Arthur M. Petacque and Hugh Hough Chicago Sun-Times, "for uncovering new evidence that led to the reopening of efforts to solve the 1966 murder of Valerie Percy.
 1975: Staff Xenia (OH) Daily Gazette, "for its coverage, under enormous difficulties, of the tornado that wrecked the city on April 3, 1974.
 1976: Gene Miller Miami Herald, "for his persistent and courageous reporting over eight and one-half years that led to the exoneration and release of two men who had twice been tried for murder and wrongfully convicted and sentenced to death in Florida.
 1977: Margo Huston The Milwaukee Journal, "for her reports on the elderly and the process of aging.
 1978: Richard Whitt Louisville Courier-Journal, "for his coverage of a fire that took 164 lives at the Beverly Hills Supper Club at Southgate, Ky., and subsequent investigation of the lack of enforcement of state fire codes.
 1979: Staff San Diego Evening Tribune, "for its coverage of the collision of a Pacific Southwest air liner with a small plane over its city.
 1980: Staff The Philadelphia Inquirer, "for coverage of the nuclear accident at Three Mile Island.
 1981: Staff Longview (WA) Daily News, "for its coverage of the Mt. St. Helens story, including the photographs by Roger A. Werth.
 1982: Staff Kansas City Star and Kansas City Times, "for coverage of the Hyatt Regency Hotel disaster and identification of its causes.
 1983: Editorial Staff Fort Wayne (IN) News-Sentinel,  "for its courageous and resourceful coverage of a devastating flood in March 1982.
 1984: Newsday team of reporters Newsday, Long Island, NY, "for their enterprising and comprehensive coverage of the Baby Jane Doe case and its far-reaching social and political implications.

List of winners for Pulitzer Prize for General News Reporting
 1985: Thomas Turcol of the Virginian-Pilot and Ledger-Star, (Norfolk, Va.) "for City Hall coverage which exposed the corruption of a local economic development official."
 1986: Edna Buchanan of the Miami Herald, "for her versatile and consistently excellent police beat reporting."
 1987: Staff of the Akron Beacon Journal, "for its coverage, under deadline pressure, of the attempted takeover of Goodyear Tire and Rubber Co. by a European financier."
 1988: Staff of the Alabama Journal (Montgomery), "for its compelling investigation of the state's unusually high infant-mortality rate, which prompted legislation to combat the problem."
 1988: Staff of Lawrence Eagle-Tribune, "for an investigation that revealed serious flaws in the Massachusetts prison furlough system and led to significant statewide reforms."
 1989: Staff of Louisville Courier-Journal, "for its exemplary initial coverage of a bus crash that claimed 27 lives and its subsequent thorough and effective examination of the causes and implications of the tragedy."
 1990: Staff of San Jose Mercury News, "for its detailed coverage of the October 17, 1989, Bay Area earthquake and its aftermath."

List of winners for Pulitzer Prize for Spot News Reporting
1991: Staff of the Miami Herald, "for stories profiling a local cult leader, his followers, and their links to several area murders."
1992: Staff of Newsday, "for coverage of a midnight subway derailment in Manhattan that left five passengers dead and more than 200 injured."
1993: Staff of the Los Angeles Times, "for comprehensive, penetrating coverage under deadline pressure of the second, most destructive day of the Los Angeles riots."
1994: Staff of the New York Times, "for its comprehensive coverage of the 1993 World Trade Center bombing."
1995: Staff of the Los Angeles Times, "for its reporting on January 17, 1994, of the chaos and devastation in the aftermath of the 1994 Northridge earthquake."
1996: Robert D. McFadden of New York Times, "for his highly skilled writing and reporting on deadline during the year."
1997: Staff of Newsday, Long Island, NY  "for its enterprising coverage of the crash of TWA Flight 800 and its aftermath."

List of winners for Pulitzer Prize for Breaking News Reporting
 1998: The Los Angeles Times staff, "for its coverage of a botched bank robbery, which led to a shootout with the police in North Hollywood."
 1999: The Hartford Courant staff, "for its coverage of a shooting spree by a state lottery worker that left five dead."
 2000: The Denver Post staff, "for its coverage of the Columbine High School massacre."
 2001: The Miami Herald staff, "for its coverage of the seizure of Elián González by federal agents."
 2002: The Wall Street Journal staff, "for its coverage of the September 11 attack on the World Trade Center."
 2003: The Eagle-Tribune staff, "for its stories on the accidental drowning of four boys in the Merrimack River."
 2004: Staff of the Los Angeles Times, "for its compelling and comprehensive coverage of the massive wildfires that imperiled a populated region of southern California."
 2005: Staff of the Star-Ledger, "for its comprehensive, clear-headed coverage of the resignation of New Jersey's governor after he announced he was gay and confessed to adultery with a male lover."
 2006: Staff of the Times-Picayune, "for its courageous and aggressive coverage of Hurricane Katrina, overcoming desperate conditions facing the city and the newspaper."
 2007: Staff of The Oregonian, "for its skillful and tenacious coverage of a family missing in the Oregon mountains, telling the tragic story both in print and online."
 2008: Staff of The Washington Post, "for its exceptional, multi-faceted coverage of the deadly shooting rampage at Virginia Polytechnic Institute and State University, telling the developing story in print and online."
 2009: Staff of The New York Times, "for its swift and sweeping coverage of a prostitution scandal that resulted in the resignation of Gov. Eliot Spitzer, breaking the story on its Web site and then developing it with authoritative, rapid-fire reports."
 2010: Staff of The Seattle Times, "for its comprehensive coverage, in print and online, of the shooting deaths of four police officers in a coffee house and the 40-hour manhunt for the suspect."
 2011: No award
 2012: Staff of The Tuscaloosa News, "for its enterprising coverage of a deadly tornado, using social media as well as traditional reporting to provide real-time updates, help locate missing people and produce in-depth print accounts even after power disruption forced the paper to publish at another plant 50 miles away."
 2013: The Denver Post for coverage of the 2012 Aurora, Colorado shooting
 2014: The Boston Globe staff "for its exhaustive and empathetic coverage of the Boston Marathon bombing and the ensuing manhunt that enveloped the city, using photography and a range of digital tools to capture the full impact of the tragedy."
 2015: The Seattle Times staff, "for its digital account of a landslide that killed 43 people and the impressive follow-up reporting that explored whether the calamity could have been avoided."
 2016: The Los Angeles Times, "For exceptional reporting, including both local and global perspectives, on the shooting in San Bernardino and the terror investigation that followed."
 2017: Staff of East Bay Times, Oakland, CA "For relentless coverage of the “Ghost Ship” fire, which killed 36 people at a warehouse party, and for reporting after the tragedy that exposed the city's failure to take actions that might have prevented it."
 2018: Staff of The Press Democrat, Santa Rosa, CA "for lucid and tenacious coverage of historic wildfires that ravaged the city of Santa Rosa and Sonoma County, expertly utilizing an array of tools, including photography, video and social media platforms, to bring clarity to its readers — in real time and in subsequent in-depth reporting."
 2019: Staff of The Pittsburgh Post-Gazette, for "immersive, compassionate coverage of the massacre at Pittsburgh’s Tree of Life synagogue that captured the anguish and resilience of a community thrust into grief."
 2020: Staff of The Courier-Journal, Louisville, KY "for its rapid coverage of hundreds of last-minute pardons by Kentucky’s governor, showing how the process was marked by opacity, racial disparities and violations of legal norms." (Moved by the jury from Local Reporting, where it was originally entered.)
2021: Staff of The Star Tribune newspaper based in Minneapolis for its coverage of the murder of George Floyd and the resulting protests in Minneapolis-Saint Paul.
2022: Staff of the Miami Herald, for reporting on the Surfside condominium collapse.

Notes

References
 Pulitzer.org Winners and Finalists – Local Reporting; Edition Time (1953–1963)
 Pulitzer.org Winners and Finalists – Local General or Spot News Reporting (1964–1984)
 Pulitzer.org Winners and Finalists – General News Reporting (1985–1990)
 Pulitzer.org Winners and Finalists – Spot News Reporting (1991–1997)
 Pulitzer.org Winners and Finalists – Breaking News Reporting (1998–present)

Breaking News Reporting